The Denniston House is a historic building located at 117 East Front Street in Cassville, Wisconsin.

History
The house was built by a firm from New York City when Wisconsin was still the Wisconsin Territory. At the time, Cassville was considered likely to be selected as the capital of the future state and the house was thought to figure prominently in the future of the potential capital. However, the city of Madison was instead chosen. The house was later owned by Nelson Dewey, the first Governor of Wisconsin after it had become a state. Dewey opened the building as a hotel in 1854.

It was added to the National Register of Historic Places on February 20, 1975.

The building is currently pending restoration.  Renovation plans have been approved by the Department of Interior.

See also
List of the oldest buildings in Wisconsin

References

External links
 

Houses on the National Register of Historic Places in Wisconsin
Houses in Grant County, Wisconsin
National Register of Historic Places in Grant County, Wisconsin
Houses completed in 1836